Mary Isabel Yu (born 1957) is an American jurist and Associate Justice of the Washington Supreme Court and former judge of the King County Superior Court. She is the state's first openly gay, Asian American, and Latina Justice. She  is also the 6th woman currently serving and the 11th woman ever to serve on Washington state's Supreme Court.

Early life and education
Yu was born in Chicago, Illinois to a Chinese father and Mexican mother.  She graduated from St. Mary's High School in 1975.  Yu then attended Dominican University and graduated in 1979 with a degree in theology.  In 1989, Yu earned a graduate degree in theology from Mundelein of Loyola University.

After completing her undergraduate education, Yu went to work for the Roman Catholic Archdiocese of Chicago.  She was initially hired by Rev. Francis J. Kane as a secretary for the Office of Peace and Justice for the Archdiocese of Chicago, but eventually rose to become director of the Office of Peace and Justice.

Yu enrolled at Notre Dame Law School in 1990.  She graduated with her J.D. degree in 1993.

Legal career and judicial service
In 1999, King County Prosecuting Attorney Norm Maleng named Yu as his deputy chief of staff.

In 2000, Washington Governor Gary Locke appointed Yu to replace retiring judge Janice Niemi on the King County Superior Court.

Yu was considered a leading contender to replace Justice Bobbe Bridge on the Washington Supreme Court when Bridge retired in December 2007.  Ultimately, Governor Christine Gregoire appointed Debra L. Stephens to fill the vacancy.

On December 9, 2012, at midnight, Mary Yu officiated the first same-sex marriages in Washington state. Judge Yu's name (coincidentally pronounced as "marry you") was deemed "the perfect name for the job" by The Stranger columnist Dominic Holden.

Appointment to Washington Supreme Court
On May 1, 2014, Judge Yu was appointed by Washington Governor Jay Inslee to the Washington Supreme Court, making her the first openly LGBTQ member of the court, in addition to the first Latina-American and Asian-American. She is the 11th woman to serve on the Washington Supreme Court (and one of six currently serving), the first person of Asian descent, the third person of Hispanic descent, and the first Hispanic woman. Yu, who is openly gay, is also the first LGBT person to hold this position. Yu is one of ten LGBT state supreme court justices currently serving in the United States.

She was sworn in on May 20, 2014 as an associate justice of the Washington Supreme Court. Justice Yu ran unopposed in 2015 to complete the term and was the highest vote getter in the State. Justice Yu was subsequently elected to the Supreme Court for a six-year term in 2016.

In October 2018, Yu joined the majority when the court abolished the state's death penalty because they found its racist imposition violated the Constitution of Washington.

Personal life
Yu resides in Seattle and in Olympia. On March 16, 2021, she appeared on Jimmy Kimmel Live! where she was recognized for the appropriateness of her name as she also is a frequent wedding officiant.  On May 24, 2022, she threw the ceremonial first pitch for a game between the Seattle Mariners and Oakland Athletics.

Awards
Yu is a Distinguished Jurist in Residence at Seattle University School of Law.  In 1984, Yu received the Caritas Veritas award from Dominican University, as an alumna exemplifying a search for truth through charity or service.

See also 
 List of Asian American jurists
 List of LGBT jurists in the United States
 List of LGBT state supreme court justices in the United States

References

External links
 Washington Courts, Supreme Court Members: Justice Mary Yu, Official Court Biography
 Official Justice Mary Yu Campaign Site

1957 births
Living people
American jurists of Chinese descent
American judges of Mexican descent
Dominican University (Illinois) alumni
Lawyers from Chicago
LGBT judges
LGBT lawyers
Loyola University Chicago alumni
Notre Dame Law School alumni
Lawyers from Seattle
Justices of the Washington Supreme Court
American LGBT people of Asian descent
LGBT people from Illinois
LGBT people from Washington (state)
LGBT Hispanic and Latino American people
21st-century American judges
LGBT appointed officials in the United States
21st-century American women judges